Şile is a city and district in Istanbul, Turkey. The district of Şile is part of Istanbul Province, and the municipality of Şile is part of Istanbul Metropolitan Municipality. Bordering Şile is the province of Kocaeli (districts of Gebze, Körfez, Derince, Kandıra) to the east and south, and Istanbul districts of Pendik to the south, Çekmeköy to the southwest, and Beykoz to the west. The boundaries of Şile were expanded by the addition of the village of Esenceli from Beykoz district in 1987. Şile consists of Şile, Yeşilvadi and Teke subdistricts, and 58 villages.  
According to the 2007 census, the population of the district was 25,169, of which 9,831 lived in the city of Şile, 2,096 in the nearby town of Ağva (Yeşilçay) and 13,242 in surrounding villages. Popular resort Ağva is also a part of Şile. However, between June and September, the population rapidly increases because of the many residents of Istanbul who have summer houses in Şile.

History 
The word şile means marjoram in Turkish. The word's etymology is said to be Greek.
There has been a fishing village here since 700 BC and a lighthouse since the Ottoman period. According to the Ottoman General Census of 1881/82-1893, the kaza of Şile had a total population of 16.770, consisting of 10.314 Muslims, 6.447 Greeks, 3 Armenians and 6 foreign citizens.

Features 

Şile is famous for its beaches. However, it is at the northernmost point of Istanbul and thus shares the same sea conditions as other Black Sea towns where strong sea undercurrents can be dangerous to inexperienced swimmers. Beachgoers drown here annually on a regular basis. The north-facing Black Sea has a much shorter holiday season than the Aegean, the Mediterranean or even the Marmara, due to the relatively colder winters.
Şile Castle is a 14th-century Genoese castle on an island in Şile. The castle was renovated in 2015, sparking criticism that the work had made it resemble the cartoon character SpongeBob SquarePants or an illustration from the video game Minecraft.
The tomb of a Muslim saint, Kum Baba, is on a tree-covered hill above Şile. Along the coast near Şile, in the village of Kızılcaköy, is a cave which, according to a local myth, is said to be the scene of events in the Anabasis of Xenophon.
Şile is also known for Şile cloth, a crimped-looking, light, see-through cotton fabric, made on the Şile coast, sold in many shops in the town and sent to the bazaars of Istanbul. A fair is held in the town to promote Şile cloth every summer.
The largest campus of Işık University is located in Şile.

Transport 
Şile is a part of Istanbul public transport system (İETT). There is a bus from Harem via Üsküdar (located at the Anatolian side of Istanbul) to Şile (İETT Lines 139 and 139A).

Climate 
Şile's climate, typical of northern Istanbul, is oceanic (Cfb) according to the Köppen climate classification, but the Trewartha climate classification classifies it as humid subtropical, similarly to the Bosphorus coast. Şile's climate is marked by high precipitation and milder summers than most of Istanbul. It is in plant hardiness zone 8b, and AHS heat zone 2.

Twin towns – sister cities 

Şile is twinned with:
 Idstein, Germany
 Barcaldin, Australia
 Cazin, Bosnia and Herzegovina

References 

Sources
 Hürel, Haldun. Semtleri, Mahalleri, Caddeleri ve Sokakları A'dan Z'ye İstanbul'un Alfabetik Öyküsü. İstanbul, 2008. .

External links 

 Işık University 
 Şile Municipality 
 Şile Port - Tourist Information 
  A firm manufacturing Şile bezi 
  Şile 75. Yıl Elementary School 

 
Populated places in Istanbul Province
Cities in Turkey
Fishing communities in Turkey
Populated coastal places in Turkey
Seaside resorts in Turkey
Tourist attractions in Istanbul Province
Districts of Istanbul Province